Myriam Lamare (born 1 January 1975, in Saint-Denis) is a French female boxer who won world titles in the World Boxing Association (WBA), World Boxing Federation (WBF), and International Boxing Federation (IBF).

Biography

Myriam Lamare was born to a French father and an Algerian mother. She spent her childhood in Aubervilliers, France. She left school at age 17, hoping to help support her family, and began boxing as an amateur because her parents did not have the means to enroll her in a club. She went on to practice athletics, full-contact karate, and boxing.

While working in a catering job in Martinique, Lamare trained in contact sports such as full-contact kickboxing. Her unexpected break happened at a facility in Fort-de-France, when she was seen by an expert coach visiting from Hatman Miloudi, a French boxing club in Bobigny. He helped Lamare develop from a regional-level fighter to elite status in a recognized national federation, the French Federation of Savate (French boxing).

When Lamare was awarded the title of vice-champion of France, she left Martinique and moved to Marseille for better training conditions. As an amateur, her record was 45 fights, 42 wins.

In November 2004, Lamare became the world champion in the super lightweight category, beating the United States' Eliza Olson. She became the first female world champion recognized by the World Boxing Association. On 29 April 2005, she defended her title by beating Ukraine's Elena Tverdokhleb before 7,000 spectators at the Palais des Sports in Marseille.

It was during the sixth defense of her world title on 2 December 2006 in Paris that Lamare, who had earned a reputation as a "killer" in the ring, met Anne Sophie Mathis for the first time. Lamare lost by referee stoppage in the sixth round. The match was voted female fight of the year by Ring Magazine. A rematch was held in Marseille on 29 June 2007, and the result was the same: Mathis dominated all 10 rounds.

On 23 January 2009, Lamare lost to Holly Holm, the reigning Women's International Boxing Association (WIBA) welterweight champion. However, on 9 October 2009, she won the vacant position of WBF welterweight champion, beating Ann Saccurato of the United States.

On 5 November 2011, Lamare became the IBF super lightweight world champion by defeating Chevelle Hallback in Toulon, France.

Professional boxing record

Mixed martial arts record

|-
|Win
|align=center|1–0
|Annalisa Bucci
|Decision (Unanimous)
|PFC 4 - Pancrase Fighting Championship 4
|
|align=center|2
|align=center|5:00
|Marsielle, France
|

References

External links
 

1975 births
French sportspeople of Algerian descent
French women boxers
French female mixed martial artists
World lightweight boxing champions
World boxing champions
Living people
French savateurs
Sportspeople from Saint-Denis, Seine-Saint-Denis
Featherweight mixed martial artists
Mixed martial artists utilizing boxing
Mixed martial artists utilizing savate
Welterweight boxers
Lightweight boxers
AIBA Women's World Boxing Championships medalists